U. A. Beeran (9 March 1925 – 31 May 2001) was an Indian politician from Kottakkal, Malappuram, Kerala, India. Beeran was affiliated with the Indian Union Muslim League and later joined with the Indian National League. Beeran served as Minister in the Government of Kerala.

Life
U.A. Beeran, was born in Kottakkal, India on March 9, 1925.

After serving in the Indian Army during the 1940s, and later working in a British engineering firm in Bombay in the early 1950s, he joined the Muslim League and became its Kozhikode District Secretary. Beeran eventually became State Secretary. He became elected to the Assembly in 1970, 1977, 1980, 1982 and 1991 as a Muslim League candidate.

Beeran served as the Minister for Education and Social Welfare from 27 January 1978 to 3 November 1978 in the Ministry headed by A.K. Antony. Beeran served again, from 24 May 1982 to 25 March 1987, as the Minister for Food and Civil Supplies in the Ministry headed by K. Karunakaran.

Beeran has served as Director of State Co-Operative Bank, and Chairman of Kerala Fishermen Welfare Corporation. He was also a former Sub-Editor and Asst. Editor of “Chandrika” and a gifted writer, authoring “Arab World and Europe” as well as publishing other books and articles. Beeran had also served for sometime as State Executive Member, “All Kerala Sahitya Parishad”.

U.A. Beeran died on 31 May 2001. The Kerala Assembly paid homage to him on 5 July 2001.

References

1925 births
2001 deaths
Malayali politicians
People from Malappuram district
Indian Union Muslim League politicians